CodeChef is an online educational platform and competitive programming community of global programmers. CodeChef started as an educational initiative in 2009 by Directi, an Indian software company. In 2020, it became owned by Unacademy.  

Along with monthly coding contests for the community, Code-Chef has initiatives for schools, colleges and women in competitive programming. It hosted the India regionals of the ICPC for college students, as well as for the International Olympiad in Informatics (IOI), for school students in India. 

Most parts of CodeChef are available without charge, but the more advanced features require a monthly subscription,

History
In 2010, Directi launched Code-Chef to help programmers improve their problem-solving skills through active participation in programming contests. The goal was to strengthen problem-solving skills by fostering friendly competition and community engagement.

In July 2010, the organization launched the "Go for Gold" initiative, enabling Indian teams to excel at the world finals of the International Collegiate Programming Contest (formerly known as ACM-ICPC).

In July 2013, it inaugurated the "Code-Chef for Schools" program to foster programming talent in school students. The initiative hopes to enable Indian students to excel at the International Olympiad in Informatics (IOI). The competition requires contestants to show necessary IT skills such as problem analysis, algorithm and data structure design, programming, and testing.

In November 2017, the first Code-Chef Certification exam was conducted. I 2018, the organization launched CodeChef for Business to target technology enterprises.

In 2020, its ownership was changed from Directi (founded by Bhavin Turakhia) to Unacademy (Gaurav Munjal, CEO).

References

Programming contests